Amanda Beverley Pedder (née Little) (born 1962 in Swindon) is a paralympic athlete from Great Britain competing mainly in category C1 events. She was born with cerebral palsy.

Amanda competed in two events in the 1984 Summer Paralympics in athletics. She won a gold and silver medal.

She got married the year after her Paralympic successes.

References

Paralympic athletes of Great Britain
Athletes (track and field) at the 1984 Summer Paralympics
Paralympic gold medalists for Great Britain
Paralympic silver medalists for Great Britain
Living people
1962 births
Medalists at the 1984 Summer Paralympics
Paralympic medalists in athletics (track and field)